Persian columns or Persepolitan columns are the distinctive form of column developed in the Achaemenid architecture of ancient Persia, probably beginning shortly before 500 BCE. They are mainly known from Persepolis, where the massive main columns have a base, fluted shaft, and a double-animal capital, most with bulls.  Achaemenid palaces had enormous hypostyle halls called apadana, which were supported inside by several rows of columns.  The Throne Hall or "Hall of a Hundred Columns" at Persepolis, measuring 70 × 70 metres was built by the Achaemenid king Artaxerxes I.  The apadana hall is even larger.  These often included a throne for the king and were used for grand ceremonial assemblies; the largest at Persepolis and Susa could fit ten thousand people at a time.

The Achaemenids had little experience of stone architecture, but were able to import artists and craftsmen from around their empire to develop a hybrid imperial style drawing on influences from Mesopotamia, Egypt and Lydia in Anatolia, as well as Elam in Persia itself.  The style was probably developed in the Palace of Darius in Susa, but the most numerous and complete survivals are at Persepolis, where several columns remain standing.  Imperial building in the style stopped abruptly with the invasion by Alexander the Great in 330 BCE, when Persepolis was burned down.

Description

The forms of the columns and capitals vary somewhat between different buildings. Generally the capitals are carved with two heavily decorated back-to-back animals projecting out from the column.  These function as brackets to support the architrave or roof timbers, while the flat backs of the animals support timbers running at right angles (see the reconstruction in the Louvre below).  As they project the animals may be called protomes.  The bull is the most common animal, but there are also lions, bulls with the head of a man in the style of the Assyrian lamassu, and griffins with the heads of eagles and the bodies of lions.

The bulls and lions may reflect the symbolism around Nowruz, the Persian New Year at the spring equinox, of an eternally fighting bull personifying the moon, and a lion personifying the Sun.  This was the day when tributary nations presented their annual tribute to the king, as depicted in the stairway reliefs at Persepolis, and it has been suggested that Persepolis was specifically built for Nowruz celebrations.

The capital is much longer than in most other styles of columns.  While some smaller columns move quickly from the animals to the plain shaft below, the largest and grandest examples have a long intervening section with double volutes at the top and, inverted, at the bottom of a long fluted square zone, although the shaft of the column is round.  At the top of the round fluted shaft are two sections with a loosely plant-based design, the upper a form of "palm capital", spreading as it rises, and the lower suggesting leaves drooping downwards.  Other capitals have the animals and the two lower plant-based elements, but not the section in between with the volutes; the example in Chicago is of this type.  There are various small mouldings between the various elements, reflecting a Greek style.  The horns and ears of the animals are often separate pieces, fitting into the head by square plugs.  The columns were polished and at least the capitals were painted, in the case of wooden ones on a plaster coating.  The style reflects influences from the many cultures that the Persian Empire conquered including Egypt, Babylon, and Lydia, as well as Greece, where the Persians had only temporary success; the final result is distinctively Persian.

It is thought the stone columns that survive were preceded by wooden versions, and these continued to be used. The move to stone may have come when sufficiently large trees for the biggest buildings became difficult or impossible to source.  The column shafts can be as tall as 20 metres. The base is in stone even for wooden columns, and sometimes carries an inscription saying which king erected the building. Most are round, but an early square type has two steps.

Use and influence
The full form of Persian column seems only to have been used at a few sites outside Persia around the empire in the Achaemenid period, in Armenia and even Levantine colonies in Iberia.  The columns influenced the Pillars of Ashoka erected in India some 80 years after Alexander the Great destroyed the Persian Empire, and other imperial buildings in the architecture of the Maurya Empire.  The much smaller Mathura lion capital of the 1st century CE shows clear influence.  They can be seen in relief decoration around Buddhist stupas in Gandhara in the 2nd or 3rd century CE, and Persian columns decorate the Karla Caves and Nasik Caves. The style did not develop in Persia itself, but elements continued to appear under later dynasties before the arrival of Islam.

Modern revival

From the 19th-century the full Persepolitan form of the column was revived, initially by Parsees in India and eclectic architects in Europe, and only later used in public buildings in Iran under the Pahlavi dynasty (from 1925), though the former royal palace in the Afif-Abad Garden, of 1863, tentatively uses some elements of the capitals.

Reza Shah, the first Pahlavi Shah of Iran, promoted interest in the Achaemenids in various ways to foster Iranian nationalism and support the legitimacy of his regime.  Significant buildings in Tehran were supervised as to the authenticity of their style by European archaeologists, especially André Godard, Maxime Siroux (both also architects), and Ernst Herzfeld, who had been brought to Iran to dig, curate, and train students. These include the police headquarters and the Bank Melli Iran headquarters.

Though the Islamic Republic of Iran prefers buildings that refer to Islamic architecture, miniature Persian columns support the Scholars Pavilion donated to the United Nations Office at Vienna in 2009.

Gallery

Notes

References

"Curtis": Curtis, John & Tallis, Nigel (eds), Forgotten Empire: The World of Ancient Persia, 2005, University of California Press, 9780520247314, Google Books. See also pp 60–64 for catalogue entries on column parts and fragments.
 Boardman, John (1998), "The Origins of Indian Stone Architecture", Bulletin of the Asia Institute, 1998, New Series, Vol. 12, (Alexander's Legacy in the East: Studies in Honor of Paul Bernard), p.13-22, JSTOR
Grigor, Tallinn, "Parsee Patronage of the Urheimat", Getty Research Journal, Issue 2 edited by Thomas W. Gaehtgens, Katja Zelljadt, 2010, Getty Publications, 9781606060179
R. Schmitt; D. Stronach (December 15, 1986). "Apadana", Encyclopaedia Iranica, Retrieved 14 April, 2018
D. N. Wilber, "Architecture vii. Pahlavi, before World War II", Encyclopaedia Iranica, 1986/2011

External links
Grigor, Tallinn, Perso-Parsi Encounters and the Making of Neo-Achaemenid Architecture in Qajar Iran and the British Raj (Part 1 of 2), video of lecture.

Achaemenid architecture
Columns and entablature
Persepolis
Sculpture of the Ancient Near East